Onychelus obustus is a species of millipede in the family Atopetholidae. It is found in North America.

References

Further reading

 

Spirobolida
Articles created by Qbugbot
Animals described in 1904